Two ships of Halcyon Lijn NV were named Stad Schiedam after the Dutch town.

 , sunk by an onboard explosion in September 1940
 , in service 1946–61

Ship names